Brighton Blue is a blue cheese made in Sussex, England. It is named after the city of Brighton in East Sussex.

Brighton Blue is made from cow's milk only by the High Weald Dairy in Horsted Keynes, West Sussex. It has a semi-soft texture. It is yellow, with blue veins. The rind is edible.

See also
 List of British cheeses

References

Blue cheeses
English cheeses
Cow's-milk cheeses
Brighton and Hove